The 2021 Vissel Kobe season was Vissel Kobe's eighth consecutive season in the J1 League following promotion to the top flight in 2013 and their 23rd J1 League season overall. In addition to the league, the club also competed in the Emperor's Cup and the J. League Cup.

Players

First-team squad

Out on loan

Competitions

J. League

Table

Results summary

Results by matchday

Matches

Emperor's Cup

J.League Cup

Group stage

Play-off stage

Statistics

Goal scorers

Last updated: 21 July 2021

Clean sheets

Last updated: 7 July 2021

Notes

References

External links
 Vissel Kobe Official Web Site
 J.League official site

Vissel Kobe
Vissel Kobe seasons